Rapana bezoar is a species of sea snail, a marine gastropod mollusc in the family Muricidae, the murex snails or rock snails.

Description

Distribution

References

bezoar
Gastropods described in 1767
Taxa named by Carl Linnaeus